Ghaem Magham park is a small park in Sheshghelan suburb of Tabriz, north-western Iran.

See also
 Tabriz
 Shah-goli

References 
 City of Tabriz on Iran Chamber Society (www.iranchamber.com)
  Editorial Board, East Azarbaijan Geography, Iranian Ministry of Education, 2000 (High School Text Book in Persian)
 https://web.archive.org/web/20070216155119/http://www.tabrizcity.org/

Parks in Tabriz